Langara–49th Avenue is an underground station on the Canada Line of Metro Vancouver's SkyTrain rapid transit system. It is located at the intersection of West 49th Avenue and Cambie Street in Vancouver, British Columbia, Canada. The station serves the southern portion of the Oakridge neighbourhood, primarily the Langara community that surrounds the station, and is within walking distance of Langara College and the Langara Golf Course.

History
Langara–49th Avenue station was opened in 2009 along with the rest of the Canada Line and was designed by the architecture firm VIA Architecture. The station is named for nearby 49th Avenue and the Langara community, which in turn is named after the Spanish admiral Juan de Lángara.

Services
Passengers exiting from this station are able to transfer to the #15 bus, which provides local surface service on Cambie Street, and the #49 bus, which travels east to Metrotown station and west to the University of British Columbia.

Station information

Station layout

Entrances
Langara–49th Avenue station is served by a single entrance located at the northeast corner of Cambie Street and 49th Avenue.

Transit connections

The following bus routes can be found in close proximity to Langara–49th Avenue:

References

Canada Line stations
Railway stations in Canada opened in 2009
Buildings and structures in Vancouver
2009 establishments in British Columbia